This is a list of events in Scottish television from 1952.

Events
14 March - BBC One Scotland launches (with a display by the Royal Scottish Country Dance Society), using the Kirk o'Shotts transmitting station.
17 August - Main television transmitters at Kirk o'Shotts transmitting station come into service.

Births
12 November - Stuart Cosgrove, journalist, broadcaster and television executive

See also
1952 in Scotland

References

 
Television in Scotland by year
1950s in Scottish television